Dorian Bay is a cove on the northwest side of Wiencke Island, 0.5 nautical miles (1 km) east-northeast of Damoy Point, in the Palmer Archipelago of Antarctica. It was discovered by the French Antarctic Expedition, 1903–05, under Jean-Baptiste Charcot, and named by him after Monsieur Dorian, a member of the French Chamber of Deputies.

Bahia Dorian Refuge and Damoy Hut
Two structures were erected on the shores of Dorian Bay; the Argentine Refugio Bahia Dorian in 1957, and a larger building known as the Damoy Hut in 1975, where it served flights to and from a summer-use ice-strip for aircraft used before the sea-ice cleared near Rothera Base. The Damoy hut and ice-strip were closed in 1995: the building is now listed as an Historic Site and Monument and is maintained and administered by the United Kingdom Antarctic Heritage Trust.

1990 wintering 
Starting in 1990, Amyr Klink spent 13 months in Dorian Bay with the ship Paratii. The wintering is the theme of his book Between Two Poles.

See also
 List of Antarctic field camps

References 

Wiencke Island
Coves of Graham Land
Landforms of the Palmer Archipelago
Historic Sites and Monuments of Antarctica